Júlio de Castilhos is a municipality of the central part of the state of Rio Grande do Sul, Brazil. The population is 19,224 (2020 est.) in an area of 1,929.38 km². Its elevation is 529 m (Praça "João Vieira de Alvarenga"), 516 m at the meteorological station and 503.81 m at the railway station. It is located 627 km west of the state capital of Porto Alegre, northeast of Alegrete.  The city is considered the Brazilian capital of the Charolais cattle.

The municipality is named after the Brazilian advocate, journalist and politician Júlio Prates de Castilhos.

History
According to historian Firmino Costa, the land was Indian and was part of the Spanish Empire until 1801, when it was annexed to Portugal.

The first pioneers came from the states São Paulo and Paraná.  In 1812 or 1813, João Vieira de Alvarenga, about 24, with his wife, Maria Rosa de Morais, and his first son, Manoel, claimed lands between the pioneer cities with the title Sesmaria, which it received in 1826. In 1834, the municipality of Cruz Alta was founded and was separated from Rio Pardo.

The municipality was created from the lands of the district of São Martinho, in Cruz Alta. In 1876, with the emancipation of São Martinho, the district of Povo Novo was created. On July 14, 1891,, the municipality of Vila Rica (the new name of Povo Novo) separated from São Martinho.

The first municipal elections were held in 1896, with Capitão Luiz Gonzaga de Azevedo as the winner and the first mayor. In 1905, the city was renamed to its current name, Júlio de Castilhos.

References

External links
http://www.citybrazil.com.br/rs/juliodecastilhos/ 

Municipalities in Rio Grande do Sul